were officials of the Tokugawa shogunate in Edo period Japan.  Appointments to this prominent office were usually fudai daimyōs, but this was amongst the senior administrative posts open to those who were not daimyōs. Conventional interpretations have construed these Japanese titles as "commissioner", "overseer" or "governor".

Responsibilities
This bakufu title identifies an official responsible for administration of the port of Nagasaki, including the Chinese and Dutch settlements located there.  This bugyō was also responsible for overseeing the port's commercial activities. The numbers of men holding the title concurrently would vary during the years of this period. At any given time, one would normally be in residence at Nagasaki, and the other would be in Edo as part of an alternating pattern.

Other duties of the Nagasaki bugyō included monitoring news and scientific developments in the West as information became available in the course of trade.  For example, the Nagasaki City Museum preserves letters from the Dutch opperhoofd to the Nagasaki bugyō about the two-year-long sales negotiations and the purchase price of a portable Dutch astronomical quadrant imported into Japan in 1792, implying that the instrument was seen as important by both the Japanese and the Dutch. The details of the instrument, along with some elaborate drawings, were provided in the Kansei Rekisho (Compendium of the Kansei Calendar), which was completed around 1844.   The compendium records the names of the instrument’s manufacturers, as inscribed on the telescope and on the pendulum box—G. Hulst van Keulen and J. Marten Kleman (1758–1845).  Although that instrument once owned by the Astronomical Office of the shogunal government is now lost, drawings of a quadrant equipped with a telescope (Gensho Kansei-kyo zu) have been reported by the National Astronomical Observatory of Japan.

Shogunal city
During this period, Nagasaki was designated a "shogunal city".  The number of such cities rose from three to eleven under Tokugawa administration.

List of Nagasaki bugyō

 Ogasawara Tamemune (1603–1604)
 Hasegawa Shigeyoshi (1604–1605)
 Hasegawa Fujihiro (1605–1614)
 Hasegawa Fujimasa (1605–1614)
 Takenaka Umene (1626–1631)
 Mizuno Morinobu (1626–1629)
 Takenaka Shigeyoshi (1629–1634)
 Imamura Masanaga (1633–1634)
 Sakakibara Motonao (1634–1640)
 Kamio Motokatsu (1634–1638)
 Ōkōchi Masakatsu (1638–1640)
 Tsuge Masatoki (1640–1642)
 Baba Toshishige (1642–1650)
 Yamazaki Masanobu (1642–1650)
 Kurokawa Masanao (1650–1665)
 Kaijō Masanobu (1651–1660)
 Ushigome Chūzaemon Shigenori (1671–1681).
 Yamaoka Kagesuke (1687–1694)
 Miyagi Masazumi (1687–1696)
 Niwa Nagamori (1699–1702)
 Ōshima Yoshinari (1699–1703)
 Sakuma Nobunari (1703–1713)
 Hisamatsu Sadamochi (1710–1715)
 Ōoka Kiyosuke (1711–1717)
 Ōmori Tokinaga (1732–1734)
 Hagiwara Yoshimasa (1736–1743)
 Matsunami Heizaemon (1744)
 Kondō Jūzō (1747).

 Ōoka Tadayori (1763–1764)
 Kurihara Morisada (1773–1775)
 Kuze Hirotami (1775–1784).
 Tsuge Masakore (1781-17__).
 Tsuchiya Morinao (1783–1784).
 Tsuchiya Masanobu (1784–1785).
 Toda Ujiharu (1784–1786),
 Tsuge Hirotami (1786).
 _ (1793).
 Matsudaira Yasuhide (1807–1808)
 Tōyama Kagekuni (1812–1816)
 Matsuyama Naoyoshi (1815–1817)
 Kanezawa Chiaki (1816–1818)
 Tsutsui Masanori (1817–1821)
 Izawa Masayoshi (1842–1845).
 Ido Satohiro (1845–1849).
 Mizuno Tadanori (1853–1854, 1857–1858).
 Arao Narimasa (1854–1859).
 Arao Shigemitsu(1854–1859)
 Takahashi Kazunuki (1862).
 Sugiura Katsukiyo (1863)
 Kyōgoku Takaakira (1863)
Ōmura Sumihiro (1863)
 Hattori Tsunezumi (1863–1866)
 Asagara Masahiro (1864–1866)
 Kawazu Sukekuni (1867–1868).

See also
 Bugyō

Notes

References
 Bodart-Bailey, Beatrice. (1999).  Kaempfer's Japan: Tokugawa Culture Observed. Honolulu: University of Hawaii Press. 
 Beasley, William G. (1972).  The Meiji Restoration. Stanford: Stanford University Press. 
 . (1955).  Select Documents on Japanese Foreign Policy, 1853–1868. London: Oxford University Press. [reprinted by RoutledgeCurzon, London, 2001.   (cloth)]
 Cullen, Louis M. (2003).  A History of Japan, 1582–1941: Internal and External Worlds. Cambridge: Cambridge University Press.  (cloth) –  (paper)
 Nussbaum, Louis-Frédéric and Käthe Roth. (2005).  Japan encyclopedia. Cambridge: Harvard University Press. ;  OCLC 58053128
 Screech, Timon. (2006). Secret Memoirs of the Shoguns: Isaac Titsingh and Japan, 1779–1822. London: RoutledgeCurzon. 
 Toyama, Mikio. (1988). Nagasaki bugyō: edo bakufu no mimi to me (Chuko shinsho). Tokyo: Chūō Kōronsha.  

Government of feudal Japan
Officials of the Tokugawa shogunate
History of Nagasaki